The 2018 Phillip Island 500 (formally known as the 2018 WD-40 Phillip Island 500) was a motor racing event for the Supercars Championship, held on 20–22 April 2018. The event was held at the Phillip Island Grand Prix Circuit on Phillip Island, Victoria, and consisted of two races, both 250 kilometres (57 laps) in length. It was the fourth event of sixteen in the 2018 Supercars Championship and hosted Races 9 and 10 of the season.

Results

Practice

Race 9

Qualifying 

 Notes
 – Michael Caruso had his best lap-time deleted for stopping on track, causing a red flag.
 – Fabian Coulthard was excluded due to his No.12 Ford Falcon FG X running too much rear wing angle and will start from the back of the grid.

Race 

 Notes
 – Jamie Whincup received a post-race Pit-Lane Penalty equivalent Time Penalty (38 seconds) for speeding in the pit-lane.
 – Simona de Silvestro received a 15-second post-race Time Penalty for Careless Driving, causing contact with Jack Le Brocq.

Championship standings after Race 9 

Drivers Championship

Teams Championship

 Note: Only the top five positions are included for both sets of standings.

Race 10

Qualifying

Race

Championship standings after Race 10 

Drivers Championship

Teams Championship

 Note: Only the top five positions are included for both sets of standings.

References 

Phillip Island 500
Phillip Island 500